Football Club Istres Ouest Provence (commonly referred to as simply Istres) is a French association football club based in Istres. The club was formed in 1920 and currently play their home matches at the Stade Parsemain in Fos-sur-Mer, a commune in the Arrondissement of Istres.

History 
FC Istres was founded in 1920 by Édouard Guizonnier as SS Istréenne. In 1969, SS Istréenne was merged into the more general sports club Istres Sports, who chose to keep Istréenne's distinctive purple and black colours. In 1977 the club made young entrepreneur Michel Aviet the club's president and ex-Yugoslav goalkeeper Georges Korac the club's manager. During the Aviet-Korac years, the club advanced from France's lower regional divisions all the way up to Ligue 2. 

In the 2004–05 season, the club reached Ligue 1 for the first time but finished last and was relegated to Ligue 2 the following year. The club returned to Ligue 2 for the 2009–10 season after winning the Championnat National 2008–09. The club got relegated from Ligue 2 in 2013–14 season after a 2–4 defeat to Dijon FCO.

In July 2015, the club was relegated to the 7th tier for financial reasons.

Naming history 
SS Istréenne (1920–1969)
Istres Sports (1969–1990)
FC Istres Ville Nouvelle (1990–2004)

Players

Current squad
Updated as of 17 May 2022. None of the players have a fixed/assigned shirt number by the club.

Notable former players
For a list of former FC Istres players, see below

Rivalries
The club has two major rivalries. First is with neighbours FC Martigues, with many encounters over the years. The second is the Provence derby against AC Arles-Avignon.

Honours 
 National
Champions (1): 2008–09
 Méditerranée Division d'Honneur
Champions (2): 1982, 1990
 Coupe de Provence
Champions (4): 1933, 1982, 1987, 1989

References

External links 

  

 
Association football clubs established in 1920
Sport in Bouches-du-Rhône
Publicly traded sports companies
1920 establishments in France
Football clubs in Provence-Alpes-Côte d'Azur